A Day or A-Day may refer to:

A Day (film), a 2017 South Korean film
A-Day (University of Alabama), an annual college football exhibition game in the United States
A-day (6 April 2006), the commencement of pension tax simplification in the United Kingdom
"A Day", a 2017 episode of the American Netflix series Love

See also
One Day (disambiguation)